Interlude is an album by American jazz pianist Billy Taylor featuring tracks recorded in 1961 and released on the Moodsville label.

Reception

Allmusic awarded the album 3 stars.

Track listing
All compositions by Billy Taylor except as indicated
 "You Tempt Me" - 3:58  
 "Did You Dream Too" - 5:10  
 "You're All That Matters" - 4:28  
 "Interlude" - 4:24  
 "You're Mine, You" (Johnny Green, Edward Heyman) - 5:21  
 "My Heart Sings" - 4:59  
 "I Sigh" - 4:04  
 "Here Today Gone Tomorrow Love" - 4:24  
 "All Alone" - 4:39

Personnel 
Billy Taylor - piano
Doug Watkins - bass
Ray Mosca - drums

References 

1961 albums
Billy Taylor albums
Moodsville Records albums
Albums recorded at Van Gelder Studio